Temporary Residence Limited (shortened TRL) is a Brooklyn, New York-based record label. TRL was started in Louisville, Kentucky in 1996 by Jeremy DeVine, and initially concentrated on releasing music by Louisville-based bands. DeVine moved to Baltimore, Maryland in the late 1990s to attend the Maryland Institute College of Art, but dropped out to concentrate on running the label by the end of the decade. DeVine later moved operations to Brooklyn, New York.

The label releases the Travels in Constants series of limited-edition albums.

In December 2005, American webzine Somewhere Cold voted Temporary Residence Limited Label of the Year on their 2005 Somewhere Cold Awards Hall of Fame list.

Current artists

William Basinski
Bellini
Canon Blue
Caroline
Rob Crow
Damsel
Eluvium
Envy
Explosions in the Sky
Field Works
Grails
Hauschka
Howard Hello
Inventions
Majeure
Maserati
Mono
My Disco
Parlour
Pinback
Prefuse 73
Prints
Sleeping People
Sybarite
Tangents
Kenseth Thibideau
Three Mile Pilot
United Nations
Watter
Young Widows
Zammuto

Past artists

The Anomoanon
The Black Heart Procession
The Books
By the End of Tonight
Cerberus Shoal
Cex
Coliseum
Dreamers of the Ghetto
The Drift
Evergreen
Fridge
Halifax Pier
Icarus
Kammerflimmer Kollektief
Kilowatthours
The Ladies
Lazarus
The Loved
Lumen
Miss Violetta Beauregarde
Nero
Nice Nice
Nightfist
Rumah Sakit
Sonna
Systems Officer
Tarentel
The 90 Day Men
Turing Machine
Wino

Split releases
 Tera Melos/By the End of Tonight
 Thursday/Envy
 Maserati/Zombi
 Jesu/Eluvium
 Steve Moore/Majeure

References

External links
 Official site

American record labels
New York (state) record labels
Record labels based in Maryland
Record labels established in 1996
Alternative rock record labels